An election to City and County of Swansea Council took place on 5 May 2022 as part of the 2022 Welsh local elections. Seventy five seats were up for election across 32 wards. The previous full election took place in 2017.

Background

Ward changes
As the result of a ward boundary review, the number of wards were reduced from 36 to 32, but with the number of councillors increasing from 72 to 75, effective from the 2022 election. The changes were designed to make the ratio between councillors and voters more equal.

Fifteen ward boundaries would be unaffected though a significant number of wards were merged or amended. The Mawr ward ceased to exist, it's communities divied amongst neighbouring wards and a new ward of Pontlliw and Tircoed created. A Mumbles ward was created by merging the Newton and Oystermouth wards. A Llwchwr ward was created by merging Kingsbridge, Lower Loughor and Upper Loughor. A new Waterfront ward was created from parts of the Castle ward and St Thomas ward. A new Waunarlwydd ward was created from part of Cockett. Dunvant, Killay North and Killay South were merged to create a Dunvant and Killay ward. The Gorseinon and Penyrheol wards were combined to become Gorseinon and Penyrheol.

Results 

Seventy five seats were up for election and the Labour Party held onto power, despite losing three seats overall. The Labour council leader, Rob Stewart, partly blamed the recent ward boundary changes for their losses. In the Clydach ward, the Conservatives won a seat by eight votes, after two recounts. The Liberal Democrats gained four seats overall, while the council also gained its first ever Green Party councillor, in Mayals. The Uplands Party won an additional two seats off Labour in the Uplands ward, despite a candidate suffering a heart attack while out campaigning.

Ward results
The following results were announced following the elections.

Bishopston (one seat)

Bon-y-maen (two seats)

Castle (four seats)

Hannah Lawson had been councillor for the ward, since replacing the late Sybil Crouch at a 2021 by-election.

Clydach (three seats)

Brigitte Rowlands was the councillor for the Mawr ward, which was partly incorporated into Clydach in 2022.

Cockett (three seats)

Cwmbwrla (three seats)

Dunvant and Killay (three seats)

Ward formed by the merger of Dunvant, Killay North and Killay South wards. Gibbard was a sitting councillor for Dunvant, while Mary Jones and Jeff Jones were the sitting councillors in Killay North and Killay South respectively.

Fairwood (one seat)

Gorseinon and Penyrheol (three seats)

Curtice and Stevens won the two seats in the Penyrheol ward at the previous 2017 election. Labour won the Gorseinon seat at the same election.

Gower (one seat)

Sitting member Richard Lewis had been elected as an Independent at the previous 2017 election.

Gowerton (two seats)

Landore (two seats)

Llangyfelach (one seat)

Llansamlet (four seats)

Llwchwr (three seats)

Robert Smith was the councillor for the former ward of Upper Loughor.

Mayals (one seat)

Morriston (five seats)

Mumbles (three seats)

Will Thomas was councillor for the former Newton ward prior to the election.

Mynydd-bach (three seats)

Pen-clawdd (one seat)

Penderry (three seats)

Penllergaer (one seat)

Pennard (one seat)

Pontarddulais (two seats)

Pontlliw and Tircoed (one seat)

St Thomas (two seats)

Sketty (five seats)

Townhill (three seats)

Uplands (four seats)

Waterfront (one seat)

Waunarlwydd (one seat)

Wendy Lewis was formerly a councillor for the Cockett ward, which until this election included Waunarlwydd.

West Cross (two seats)

*''' = sitting councillor in same ward prior to election**''' = sitting councillor in a related former ward prior to election

References 

City and County of Swansea Council elections
Swansea Council election